Armenia competed at the 2018 European Athletics Championships in Berlin, Germany, from 6-12 August 2018. A delegation of 2 athletes were sent to represent the country. 

The following athletes were selected to compete by the Armenian Athletic Federation.

 Men 
 Track and road

Field events

References

Nations at the 2018 European Athletics Championships
2018
European Athletics Championships